The Al-Khawarizmi Astronomy Complex is an observatory in Masjid Tanah, Alor Gajah District, Melaka, Malaysia. It is owned by Melaka State Government and operated by Melaka Mufti Department.

Name
The astronomy complex is named after astronomer Muhammad ibn Musa al-Khwarizmi.

History
The astronomy complex was established in different stages. The first stage was the observatory established in 2002, followed by the planetarium in 2005 and finally the training centre in 2008. The total cost for its development was RM20 million.

Architecture
 Observatory
 Planetarium
 Training Centre

See also
 List of tourist attractions in Melaka

References

External links
 

2002 establishments in Malaysia
Buildings and structures completed in 2002
Buildings and structures in Malacca
Planetaria in Malaysia
Tourist attractions in Malacca